Aleksandr Fyodorov may refer to:

 Aleksandr Fyodorov (footballer, born 1965), Russian footballer who played in the Russian Premier League for FC Zhemchuzhina Sochi
 Aleksandr Fyodorov (footballer, born 1970), Russian footballer who played in the Russian Premier League for FC KAMAZ Naberezhnye Chelny
 Aleksandr Fyodorov (bodybuilder) (born 1978), Russian bodybuilder
 Aleksandr Georgiyevich Fyodorov (born 1944), Russian football coach
 Aleksandr Fyodorov (water polo) (born 1981), Russian water polo player
 Aleksandr Viktorovich Fyodorov (born 1954), Russian educator